Deutzia schneideriana (长江溲疏) is a flowering shrub in the family Hydrangeaceae native to Anhui, Gansu, Hubei, Hunan, Jiangxi, and perhaps Zhejiang provinces in China. It grows 1–2 meters tall, with purplish red branchlets of 8–12 cm length.

Synonyms
 Deutzia schneideriana var. laxiflora Rehder

References

 Sargent, Charles Sprague, Plantae Wilsonianae. An Enumeration of the Woody Plants Collected in Western China for the Arnold Arboretum of Harvard University. Cambridge, MA. 1(1): 7. 1911 [31 Jul 1911]
 Hortipedia entry

Flora of China
schneideriana